Tekeriš is a village in Serbia. It is situated in the Loznica municipality, in the Mačva District. This village has a Serbian ethnic majority and its population numbers 370 people, according to the 2002 census.

History
Tekeriš is famous because of the Battle of Cer that occurred here, which was the first allied victory in World War I.

See also
List of places in Serbia

Populated places in Mačva District
Loznica